Reece Willison (born 27 May 1999) is a Scottish footballer who plays as a goalkeeper for  club Alloa Athletic.

Early life
Willison was born in Glasgow.

Career
Willison had spells in the youth teams of Aberdeen, St Mirren and Celtic, before joining Airdrieonians on a pre-contract agreement in May 2019. He was released by the club at the end of the 2019–20 season, having made four appearances. He joined Alloa Athletic on 17 October 2020, and made his debut that day in a 1–0 defeat to Greenock Morton.

References

1999 births
Living people
Scottish footballers
Footballers from Glasgow
Association football goalkeepers
Airdrieonians F.C. players
Alloa Athletic F.C. players
Scottish Professional Football League players